"Madreterra" is the official anthem of Sicily since 2003. It was the first regional anthem in Italy, and was written by Vincenzo Spampinato, who was chosen after an official competition. However, other songs (notably, Suoni la tromba, English translation: Blare the trumpet) have been traditionally regarded as national anthems of Sicily. The lyrics are in Italian. Madreterra was performed in public for the first time at the Ancient theatre of Taormina on 14 June 2003 by the Sicilian Symphony Orchestra and the Musa 2000 Choir.

Lyrics

References

External links
 Madreterra at Regione Siciliana's official website

Music of Sicily
Italian anthems
Regional songs